West Waterford was a UK Parliament constituency in Ireland, returning one Member of Parliament from 1885 to 1918.

Prior to the 1885 United Kingdom general election and after the dissolution of Parliament in 1918 the area was part of the County Waterford constituency.

Boundaries
This constituency comprised the western part of County Waterford. It included the baronies of Coshmore and Coshbride, Decies within Drum, and that part of the barony of Decies-without-Drum not contained within the constituency of East Waterford.

Members of Parliament
{| class="wikitable"
|-
!colspan="2"|Election!!Member!!Party
|-
|style="background-color: " |
| 1885
| Jasper Douglas Pyne
| Nationalist
|-
|
| 1888
|colspan="2" | ''Seat vacant|-
|style="background-color: " |
| 1890
|rowspan="2"| Alfred Webb
| Nationalist
|-
|style="background-color: " |
| 1892
| Anti-Parnellite Nationalist
|-
|style="background-color: " |
| 1895
|rowspan="2"| James John O'Shee (formerly Shee)
| Anti-Parnellite Nationalist
|-
|style="background-color: " |
| 1900
| Nationalist
|-
|colspan="2" align="center"|1918
|colspan="2"| Constituency abolished – see County Waterford
|}

Elections
Elections in the 1880s

Elections in the 1890s
Pyne's death causes a by-election.

Webb's resignation causes a by-election.

Elections in the 1900s

Elections in the 1910s

Notes and ReferencesNotesReferences'''

Sources 

Westminster constituencies in County Waterford (historic)
Constituencies of the Parliament of the United Kingdom established in 1885
Constituencies of the Parliament of the United Kingdom disestablished in 1918